Supertoon (stylized as SUPERTOON) is an international animation festival in Šibenik, Croatia. In 2017 it took place from 16 to 21 July.

The purpose of the festival is to systematically monitor and provide an insight into recent Croatian and world short-meter animation film and video production through a range of competition and out-of-competition programmes. An additional aim is to create a platform for a direct communication and exchange of ideas and experiences for all festival participants and guests.

Competition programme
The festival competition programme is divided into three categories:

Short Animated Film category presents recent world shorts completed in the last two years.
Short Students Animated Film category presents short-format, non-commissioned students animated films or videos.
Films for Children and Youth competition brings animated works aimed specifically at a younger audience.
Animated Music Video programme is envisaged as a sort of animated music playlist.
Animated Commercials programme is commissioned and applied animation in the field of advertising or promotion.

In addition to competition categories, the Supertoon programme includes panoramas, retrospectives and theme screenings, exhibitions, workshops and lectures.

See also
Zagreb Film
Cinema of Croatia

External links
Official Website
Gatsunime Website
Zoro.to Anime Website
Online Anime Website

Animation film festivals
Šibenik
Film festivals in Croatia
Recurring events established in 2011